Anete Šteinberga (born 29 January 1990) is a Latvian basketball player for Tango Bourges Basket and the Latvian national team. She participated at the EuroBasket Women 2017.

University of Texas at El Paso statistics
Source

References

External links

 Anete Šteinberga at Tbf.org
 Anete Šteinberga at Galatasaray.org

1990 births
Living people
Latvian women's basketball players
People from Ogre, Latvia
Centers (basketball)
Latvian expatriate basketball people in Belgium
Latvian expatriate basketball people in Italy
Latvian expatriate basketball people in Russia
Latvian expatriate basketball people in Turkey
Latvian expatriate basketball people in the United States
Latvian expatriate basketball people in the Czech Republic
UTEP Miners women's basketball players
Galatasaray S.K. (women's basketball) players